"I Know a Heartache When I See One" is a song by Jennifer Warnes from her fifth LP, Shot Through the Heart.  It was the first of three charting singles from the album.

The song peaked at #19 on the U.S. Billboard Hot 100 and #14 on the Adult Contemporary chart. It was also a modest hit in Canada (#46).

"I Know a Heartache When I See One" did best on the Country and Western charts, reaching #10 in the U.S. and #12 in Canada. It became Arista Records' lone C&W top ten hit prior to 1990.

Chart history

Cover versions
Canadian country singer Lisa Brokop recorded a cover for her 1996 album Lisa Brokop.
Country singer Jo Dee Messina recorded her own version of the song for her 1998 album I'm Alright.

References

External links
 

1979 songs
1979 singles
Jennifer Warnes songs
Jo Dee Messina songs
Lisa Brokop songs
Arista Records singles
Songs written by Rory Bourke
Songs written by Kerry Chater
Songs written by Charlie Black